Colm McCarthy may refer to:
Colm McCarthy (director) (born 1973), film director
Colm McCarthy (economist), economist at University College Dublin